Chen Zhan (born 11 October 1990) is a Chinese retired female volleyball player. She is a member of the China women's national volleyball team and played for Jiangsu in 2014. She was part of the Chinese national team that finished in the second place at the 2014 FIVB Volleyball Women's World Championship in Italy. She was elected the Most Valuable Player of the 2007 FIVB Volleyball Girls' U18 World Championship.

Clubs
  Jiangsu (2006–2018)

References

1990 births
Living people
Chinese women's volleyball players
Place of birth missing (living people)
Liberos
21st-century Chinese women